Georgiana Margaretta Zornlin (1800–1881) was an English artist and writer.

She was the daughter of John Jacob Zornlin, a London merchant of Swiss background, and Elizabeth Alsager, who was the sister of the journalist Thomas Massa Alsager. The science writer Rosina Zornlin was her sister. In 1821 she published early lithographs of Christchurch, Hampshire with Joseph Netherclift. In the 1820s she was a pupil of Benjamin Robert Haydon.

Zornlin wrote an anonymous illustrated work A Paper Lantern for Puseyites, a light-hearted poetic spoof on young Tractarians. She also published works on the urim and thummim, and heraldry. William Jaggard's Shakespeare Bibliography (1911) records three papers of hers for the Shakespeare Society.

Notes

External links

1800 births
1881 deaths
English women painters
English women poets
English people of Swiss descent
Painters from London
19th-century English painters
19th-century English writers
19th-century English women writers
19th-century English women artists
19th-century English poets